Taylor Garrison Belcher (July 1, 1920 – August 6, 1990) was a United States Ambassador to Cyprus and Peru who helped mediate conflicts in both countries.

Early life
Taylor Garrison Belcher was born in Staten Island. His parents were Taylor Belcher and Miriam (Frazee) Belcher. He graduated from Brown University with a degree in international trade and finance in 1941.

Family
Belcher married Edith Anthony on October 22, 1942. They had two sons, Anthony and Taylor III.

Career

Early career
During World War II, Belcher served in the Navy as an officer of the battleship, Alabama. After the war, he joined the State Department. During his tenure with the State Department, he was stationed at Mexico City, Glasgow and Washington.

Political career
Belcher was appointed ambassador to Cyprus by President Lyndon B. Johnson in 1964. He served in that position until 1969. Belcher was awarded the State Department's Secretary's Distinguished Service Award as a result of his peace-keeping abilities during the eruption of violence between Greek and Turkish Cypriots. In 1969, he was appointed ambassador to Peru by President Richard Nixon. He served as ambassador to Peru until his retirement in 1974.

Other activities
Belcher served in various organizations. At the time of his death, he was a director of the Putnam County Historical Society, a trustee and chairman of the Alice and Hamilton Fish Library, a trustee of the Malcolm Gordon School, and president of the Garrison Station Plaza and the Garrison's Landing Association. He was also a former chairman of the Heritage Task Force for the Hudson Valley.

Later life
After his retirement from public service, Belcher lived in Garrison's Landing in Garrison, New York.

Death
Belcher died at Peekskill Community Hospital in New York on August 6, 1990, at the age of 70. According to a family spokesman, he died of cancer.

References

Ambassadors of the United States to Cyprus
Ambassadors of the United States to Peru
1920 births
1990 deaths
People from Staten Island
United States Foreign Service personnel
Brown University alumni
United States Navy personnel of World War II
American expatriates in Mexico
American expatriates in the United Kingdom